The Roman Catholic Diocese of Mont-Laurier is a Roman Catholic diocese that includes part of the Province of Quebec. The diocese contains 51 parishes, 32 active diocesan priests, 7 religious priests, and 82,000 Catholics.  It also has 66 Women Religious, and 15 Religious Brothers. The Vatican's website, as of 2011, gives an area of 19,968 (units not given); a total population of 95,256; a Catholic population of 77,340; 35 priests; 1 permanent deacon; and 58 religious.

After Bishop Lortie's retirement, this diocese came under an Apostolic Administrator, Most Rev. Paul-André Durocher, Archbishop of Gatineau, the metropolitan of the (ecclesiastical) province which includes this diocese. On June 1, 2020, Pope Francis appointed Raymond Poisson to serve as Bishop of Mont-Laurier, concurrently as Bishop of Saint-Jerome, in the form of “in persona episcopi” (Latin, means "in the persons of the bishop).

Diocesan bishops
The following is a list of the bishops of Mont-Laurier, including auxiliary bishops, and their terms of service:
François-Xavier Brunet (1913-1922)
Joseph-Eugène Limoges (1922-1965)
Joseph Louis André Ouellette (1956-1978)
Jean Gratton (1978-2001)
Vital Massé (2001-2012)
Paul Lortie (2012-2019)
Raymond Poisson (2020–Present)

References

Diocese of Mont-Laurier page at catholichierarchy.org retrieved July 14, 2006

Mont-Laurier
Catholic Church in Quebec